Arthur Marshall Stoneham, FRS (18 May 1940 – 18 February 2011), known as Marshall Stoneham, was a British physicist who worked for the United Kingdom Atomic Energy Authority, and from 1995 was Massey professor of physics at University College London.

Biography

Stoneham was born in Barrow-in-Furness on 18 May 1940, son of Garth Rivers Stoneham, consultant obstetrician and gynaecologist, and fellow New Zealander Nancy Wooler (née Leslie). He was educated at Barrow Grammar School for Boys. He then read physics at the University of Bristol, where he graduated with a BSc in 1961, and a PhD, supervised by Maurice Pryce, in 1964.

In 1964 he joined AERE Harwell, where he spent more than 30 years. After successive promotions he was made chief scientist of AEA Technology, an offshoot of AERE. But as the ability to conduct basic research diminished at Harwell  in the 1990s Stoneham was drawn to UCL, where he was appointed Professor of Physics and Director of the Centre for Materials Research in 1995. He also joined a group, headed by John Finney, working on condensed matter and material physics, which led to the formation of the London Centre for Nanotechnology.

The man and his family

Arthur Marshall Stoneham married Doreen Montgomery in Barrow-in-Furness in 1962. They had two daughters, Elise and Nicky. He died on 18 February 2011, at Churchill Hospital, Oxford after complications in surgery. A Thanks giving service to celebrate his life was held at Dorchester Abbey on 15 March, and a concert, ‘in memoriam Marshall Stoneham’, was performed by the Dorchester Wind Players (DWP) on 8 April 2012 at St Nicolas Church, Abingdon.

Stoneham was a keen amateur horn player and musicologist, playing with the DWP for over forty years, and performing the extremely difficult solo part of the Strauss Horn Concerto in concert. Robert Kirby-Harris remembered him as “a wonderful person to work with: committed, enthusiastic and kindly with a penetrating intelligence and gentle wit”.

Doreen, Elise and Nicky are all directors of Oxford Authentication, a company founded by Marshall and Doreen.

Awards and honours

Fellowship of the Institute of Physics
Fellowship of the American Physical Society
Fellowship if the Royal Society (in 1989)
Gave Royal Society’s Zeneca prize lecture (1995)
Honorary Fellow of UCL
Awarded the Guthrie Medal and Prize of the Institute of Physics (2006)
President of the IOP in 2010

Books and papers

Stoneham's research papers are listed here

References

British physicists
People educated at Barrow-in-Furness Grammar School for Boys
Fellows of the Royal Society
Presidents of the Institute of Physics
1940 births
2011 deaths